Two Red Roses is a 1928 German silent film directed by Robert Land and starring Liane Haid, Alexander Murski, and Harry Halm. The film was released in England by First National Pathé.

The film's art direction was by Andrej Andrejew.

Cast
 Liane Haid as Friedel Schulze
 Alexander Murski as Direktor Eriksen
 Harry Halm as Hans, sein Sohn
 Oskar Marion as Ernst Ritter, Komponist
 Oreste Bilancia as Generaldirektor Bergen
 Trude Hesterberg as Eugenie, seine Frau
 La Jana as Lilli, seine Tochter
 Gyula Szőreghy as Rothe
 Teddy Bill as Georg

References

Bibliography
 Ken Wlaschin. The Silent Cinema in Song, 1896–1929: An Illustrated History and Catalog of Songs Inspired by the Movies and Stars, with a List of Recordings. McFarland & Company, 2009.

External links

1928 films
Films of the Weimar Republic
German silent feature films
Films directed by Robert Land
German black-and-white films
1920s German films